Richie Williams (born 1970) is an American soccer coach and former player.

Richie Williams is also the name of:
 Richie Williams (basketball) (born 1987), American basketball player
 Richie Williams (Canadian football) (born 1983), American quarterback in Canadian football
 Richard Williams (rugby league) (born 1986), Indigenous Australian former rugby league footballer

See also
 Richard Williams (disambiguation)